Meet Me in Miami is a 2005 New Zealand film directed by Eric Hannah and Iren Koster and starring Carlos Ponce, Tara Leniston, Eduardo Verastegui, and Ayşe Tezel. The film received positive reviews despite its limited release.

Plot 
Luis was 12 when he met Julia. She was staying at the hotel with her family while on holiday, and when the two met, the connection was instant. They spent the summer together, laughing, playing and wishing it would never end. When it was finally time for Julia to return to her native New Zealand, the two made a promise to meet back at the fountain the same time every year. Each year Luis waited, but no Julia.

Now 10 years later, Luis finally decides it's time to put destiny to the test. Dragging along his best friend Eduardo, they board a plane to New Zealand determined to find Julia and win her back.

Cast

External links 
  
 

2005 films
New Zealand comedy films
2005 comedy films
2000s English-language films